Sous lieutenant Charles Alfred Quette (19 May 1895 – 5 June 1918) was a French World War I flying ace credited with ten confirmed and five unconfirmed aerial victories.

Early life

Charles Alfred Quette was born in Paris on 19 May 1895.

World War I
Quette originally was a soldat de 2e classe in the infantry. He transferred to aviation and on 5 July 1915 joined Escadrille MS.38 as a mechanic. On 24 August, he transferred again, to Escadrille C.64 as a gunner/observer on Caudrons. His service there earned him two citations in orders. He then trained as a pilot. On 11 April 1917, he was promoted to Corporal and assigned to Escadrille N.62 as a Spad pilot.

Quette scored his first aerial victory on 22 July 1917. He was then awarded the Médaille militaire; the accompanying citation noted he had already been wounded twice. He was also promoted to sergeant on 25 August 1917. In September, Quette scored four more times to become an ace. A promotion to adjutant followed.

Between 15 March and 4 June 1918, Quette scored five more times. On 5 June, having been promoted to temporary sous lieutenant five days prior, Quette disappeared and was posted missing in action. On 9 July 1918, he was mentioned in dispatches for his ten victories.

Honors and awards

Pilot of Escadrille N62. Young and full of courage and sang-froid. He has distinguished himself in many situations and has had numerous combats, during the course of which his plane was hit several times by enemy fire. On 22 July 1917, he downed a German plane after a difficult combat. Wounded twice and cited in orders twice during the course of the war. 
–Médaille Militaire citation–

Croix de Guerre also awarded

See also
 List of people who disappeared

Endnotes

References
 Over the Front: A Complete Record of the Fighter Aces and Units of the United States and French Air Services, 1914-1918 Norman L. R. Franks, Frank W. Bailey. Grub Street, 1992. , .

External links
 The Aerodrome website at http://www.theaerodrome.com/aces/france/quette.php
 :fr:Charles Quette

1895 births
1918 deaths
Recipients of the Croix de Guerre 1914–1918 (France)
French military officers
French World War I flying aces
Missing in action of World War I
Aerial disappearances of military personnel in action
French military personnel killed in World War I